The Sea Gypsies, also known as Shipwreck, is a 1978 family adventure film directed by Stewart Raffill and starring Robert Logan and Mikki Jamison. The film's tagline is It began as a dream... and became an adventure of a lifetime.

Plot
Travis and his two daughters, Courtney and Samantha, set off on a dangerous trip around the world on a sailboat. Along for the trip is Kelly, a journalist who has been assigned to cover the voyage. Also, Jesse, a stowaway, is found aboard adding a fifth person on the trip. Soon, they are shipwrecked on the coast of Alaska and must learn how to survive together in a sometimes dangerous environment.

Main cast
Robert Logan as Travis Maclaine 
Mikki Jamison as Kelly Zimmerman
Heather Rattray as Courtney Maclaine 
Shannon Saylor as Samantha Maclaine 
Cjon Damitri Patterson as Jesse
Mark Litke as TV Reporter
Nancy Loomis as Girlfriend

See also
 Across the Great Divide
 The Adventures of the Wilderness Family

External links
 
 
 

1978 films
1970s adventure films
1978 drama films
American children's adventure films
American children's drama films
Films about survivors of seafaring accidents or incidents
Films directed by Stewart Raffill
Films set in Alaska
Films set on uninhabited islands
Films shot in Alaska
Films shot in Oregon
Sailing films
Sea adventure films
Warner Bros. films
1970s English-language films
1970s American films